Letícia Román (née Novarese; born 12 August 1941) is an Italian film actress.

Early years
Román was born Letizia Novarese in Rome in 1941. She was the daughter of stage actress Giuliana Gianni and screenwriter/costume designer Nino Novarese.

Taught by tutors, Roman received the equivalent of an American high school education. She is fluent in five languages.

Roman said that her parents didn't want her to be an actress, but after arriving in Hollywood, she began studying acting under Sandy Meisner. She studied with Gladys Vogeler to diminish her accent.

Career 

Román started her film career with a small part in the Elvis Presley film G.I. Blues where she plays Tina. Román had her first leading role in the film The Girl Who Knew Too Much (1963), where she plays Nora Davis, a mystery obsessed woman who believes she has witnessed a murder. After completing the film, Román went to Germany where she made several films including Russ Meyer's Fanny Hill.

Later years
Román retired from acting after getting married in 1966 to Peter Anthony Gelles, by whom she had one child. According to actor John Saxon, Román later worked in the real estate business in Los Angeles briefly.

Selected filmography
 
 G.I. Blues (1960)
 Pirates of Tortuga (1961)
 Gold of the Seven Saints (1961)
 Charge of the Black Lancers (1962)
 Pontius Pilate (1962)
 The Girl Who Knew Too Much (1963)
 Fanny Hill (1964)
 Marry Me, Cherie (1964)
  (1965)
 The Gentlemen (1965)
 Who Wants to Sleep? (1965)
 When the Grapevines Bloom on the Danube (1965)
 Old Surehand (1965)
 High Season for Spies (1966)
 F Troop: La Dolce Courage (1966)
 The Spy in the Green Hat (1967)
 Mannix: Make It Like It Never Happened - TV episode (1967)
 The Big Valley (1967)

References

External links
 

1941 births
Italian film actresses
Actresses from Rome
Living people
20th-century Italian actresses